The Long Day's Dying is a 1968 British Techniscope war film directed by Peter Collinson, based on the 1962 novel of the same name by Alan White and starring David Hemmings. It was listed to compete at the 1968 Cannes Film Festival, but the festival was cancelled due to the events of May 1968 in France. The film was then able to compete at the 1968 San Sebastián International Film Festival, where it won its top prize, the Golden Shell for Best Film.

Plot
Three British paratroopers are cut off from their unit and are lost behind enemy lines. Sheltering in a deserted farmhouse, they are awaiting the return of their Sergeant who has ventured out in an attempt to locate their unit. The three soldiers are Tom, a world-weary cynical veteran, John, a middle-class educated thinker who despises war and Cliff, an eager soldier who loves his work. All three are highly trained professional killers who, regardless of their own personal thoughts, do not hesitate to perform their duties.

Two German soldiers approach the farmhouse and the paratroopers dispatch them both. The second of the enemy attackers is stalked by the paratroopers who virtually toy with their victim before John kills him, finishing the man off up close, although the experience renders him sick. As the three men eat a meal, they are surprised and captured by a third German named Helmut, a paratrooper like themselves. The British soon turn the tables and capture Helmut but the latter, who speaks English, manages to manipulate his captors into keeping him alive. The group leave the house in search of their Sergeant whom they eventually find dead in the woods, his throat cut. The men continue on, trying to find their way back to Allied lines. They come across a farmhouse, where a trio of Germans are sheltering. The paratroopers cautiously approach and shoot them, only to find that the Germans are already dead.

After spending the night in the house, the group continues their walk back to the British lines, only to run into a German patrol. In the ensuing battle, all of the Germans are killed but Cliff is fatally wounded. John and Tom reach the frontline, taking their prisoner Helmut with them but nearby British troops mistake them all to be German and open fire, mortally wounding Tom. Both injured themselves, John and Helmut take cover in a muddy ditch. There, John decides to kill Helmut with a small skewer he has always carried with him. Delirious with exhaustion and trauma, John staggers into the open, yelling that he is a pacifist before the British troops open fire again, shooting him dead.

Cast
 David Hemmings as John
 Tony Beckley as Cliff
 Tom Bell as Tom Cooper
 Alan Dobie as Helmut

Production
According to Michael Deeley, he and Peter Yates worked on the first draft of the script but were denied credit. He claims he gave Collinson the job partly to see if he was up to the task of directing The Italian Job (1969).

Collinson, who had worked with him before in The Penthouse (1967), would work with Tony Beckley a third and final time in The Italian Job.

Critical reception
Renata Adler, reviewing the film's release in The New York Times in 1968, disliked it. "There are some excellent scenes....But the screenplay is unendurable. Smug, dimestore Existential....stale, self-important and tough...No characterization...One for the English antiwar cheapshot satire brigade".

Mark Connelly wrote (in 2003) of The Long Day's Dying. 'Critics hated the film, finding in it much the same faults as they identified in The Charge of the Light Brigade'. (Charles Wood wrote the screenplay for both films) 'They were confused by the fact that it was an anti-war film that celebrated some of the values of war and army life. Wood was showing, as he did in The Charge, that war has a complex hold over the minds and imaginations of humans. That although it is ultimately an awful, destructive, wasteful process, it has inspired men and motivated them intellectually and emotionally'.

References

External links

 
 

1968 films
1960s political films
1968 war films
British World War II films
Films based on British novels
Films directed by Peter Collinson
Paramount Pictures films
Films scored by Malcolm Lockyer
Films set in Germany
Films set in the 1940s
Anti-war films
1960s English-language films
1960s British films